Fujiwara no Kusuko  (October 13, 810) was a Japanese court lady. She is best known for her role in the Kusuko Incident.

Early life 
Fujiwara was the daughter of Fujiwara no Tanetsugu. She was known for her beauty. After her father's assassination in 785, she married  and bore three sons and two daughters. One of those daughters was invited to become a consort for Emperor Heizei, which brought Fujiwara to court. When she reached court, Fujiwara earned Heizei's favor and became his consort.

Kusuko incident 
The Kusuko incident can also be called the "Retired Emperor Heizei Incident". After Emperor Heizei abdicated the throne in 809, a decision that Fujiwara and her brother Fujiwara no Nakanari opposed, his brother Emperor Saga took the throne. Many of these edicts were fueled by Fujiwara's advice, because she wanted to return to the level of power she had when he was emperor. A rivalry formed between Heizei and Saga's courts, culminating in Heizei deciding to change the country's capital to Heijō-kyō, where his court was based. Saga vetoed this and stripped Fujiwara of her position, removing Heizei's ability to make imperial decrees.

Heizei decided to gather an army and move against Saga. He and Fujiwara made it Yamato province before they realized the strength of Saga's forces and decided to return to Heijō-kyō. When they returned, Fujiwara committed suicide by drinking poison.

References 

810 deaths
Heian period
Deaths by poisoning